Konojedy is a municipality and village in Prague-East District in the Central Bohemian Region of the Czech Republic. It has about 300 inhabitants.

Administrative parts
The hamlet of Klíče is an administrative part of Konojedy.

History
The first written mention of Konojedy is from 1352.

References

Villages in Prague-East District